Vietnam/Heaven is a compilation album by the band Shockabilly. The album is a combination of two previously unavailable LPs, and was well received by critics. These recordings feature many sonic techniques that were later emulated by bands such as Primus and Sonic Youth.

Track listing

Vietnam 
 "Pile Up All Architecture" (Chadbourne, Kramer)
 "Born on the Bayou" (John Fogerty)
 "Your U.S.A. and My Face" (Chadbourne)
 "(I Don't Wanna Go To) Vietnam" (John Lee Hooker)
 "Flying" (George Harrison, John Lennon, Paul McCartney, Ringo Starr)
 "Nicaragua" (Kramer, Ed Sanders)
 "Paris" (Kramer)
 "Iran Into Tulsa" (Chadbourne, Kramer)
 "Georgia In a Jug" (Bobby Braddock)
 "Lucifer Sam" (Syd Barrett)
 "Signed D.C." (Arthur Lee)

Heaven 
 "Instant Karma!" (John Lennon)
 "She Was a Living, Breathing Piece of Dirt" (Chadbourne)
 "Red Headed Stranger" (Edith Lindeman Calisch, Carl Stutz)
 "When You Dream About Bleeding" (Chadbourne)
 "Tau & The Soldier" (Kramer)
 "Life's a Gas" (Marc Bolan)
 "Tray-Panning the Man" (Kramer)
 "Hendrix Buried in Tacoma" (Chadbourne)
 "How Can You Kill Me, I'm Already Dead" (Chadbourne)
 "Vampire Tiger Girl Strikes Again" (Chadbourne)
 "Pity Me, Sheena" (Kramer)
 "Happy New Year" (Chadbourne)
 "Our Metempsychosis" (Kramer)

Release history

References

External links 
 

1990 compilation albums
Shockabilly albums
Albums produced by Kramer (musician)
Shimmy Disc compilation albums